Edward Southwell Sr. (4 September 1671 – 4 December 1730) was an Anglo-Irish lawyer and politician.

He was the second but only surviving son of Sir Robert Southwell of Kings Weston, near Bristol and educated at Kensington School, Lincoln's Inn (1686) and Merton College, Oxford (1687).

He served in a number of high public offices including Chief Prothonotary of the Common Pleas in Ireland (1692–1700), clerk of the Privy Council (1693 to death), judge of the Admiralty court and vice-admiral of Munster (1699 to death). He was several times joint commissioner of the Privy Seal (1701–1702, 1715 and 1716). He was elected a Fellow of the Royal Society in 1692 and twice served on their council.

He sat in the Irish House of Commons for Kinsale from 1692 to 1699, for Dublin University from 1703 to 1713 and then again for Kinsale from 1713 to his death.

In 1702 Southwell succeeded his father as Principal Secretary of State (Ireland) and was appointed to the Privy Council of Ireland the same year. Both appointments were for life.

He sat in the House of Commons of England and the House of Commons of Great Britain between 1702 and 1715 as MP for Rye, Tregony and Preston.

In 1712 he commissioned Sir John Vanbrugh to build Kings Weston House in Kingsweston, Bristol.

He died in 1730 and was buried at Kingsweston. He had married Elizabeth Cromwell, 8th Baroness Cromwell, who died in 1709, and their son Edward Southwell succeeded in turn to the Secretaryship and to the Kings Weston estate. He had later married Anne, daughter of William Blathwaite of Derham, Gloucestershire.

References

 

1671 births
1730 deaths
People from Gloucestershire (before 1904)
Alumni of Merton College, Oxford
Members of Lincoln's Inn
17th-century Anglo-Irish people
18th-century Anglo-Irish people
Members of the Privy Council of Ireland
Irish MPs 1692–1693
Irish MPs 1695–1699
Irish MPs 1703–1713
Irish MPs 1713–1714
Irish MPs 1715–1727
Irish MPs 1727–1760
English MPs 1702–1705
English MPs 1705–1707
Members of the Parliament of Great Britain for English constituencies
British MPs 1707–1708
Members of the Parliament of Great Britain for constituencies in Cornwall
British MPs 1710–1713
British MPs 1713–1715
Chief Secretaries for Ireland
Fellows of the Royal Society
Members of the Parliament of Ireland (pre-1801) for Dublin University
Members of the Parliament of Ireland (pre-1801) for County Cork constituencies
Prothonotaries